Kaggalada Hundi or Kaggaladahundi  is a village in Terakanambi Hobli Gundlupete Taluk Chamarajanagar district in the southern state of Karnataka, India.

Agriculture 

Main crops are jowar, ragi, turmeric, sugar cane, onion and banana. Farmers grow vegetables like tomato, beans. It is a fairly dry region on the rain-shadow side of the Western Ghats with an average annual rainfall of about 600 mm (almost all of it falling during the monsoon months of July through October. The natural vegetation of the area is Dry Thorn Forest, as can be seen in the nearby reserve forests on the boundary of Bandipur National Park.

Near by places to visit
 Triyambakeshwara Temple - 2 km

 Paarvati Betta - 5 km

 Himavad Gopalswamy hill - 22 km

 Bandipur National Park - 25 km

Getting there

Road 
Kaggaladahundi is around 7 km from the taluk headquarters, Gundlupete and 34 km from the district headquarters, Chamarajanagar. It's located in the State Highway SH-81 (Yelandur - Gundlupet road).

Rail 
The nearest railway station is in Chamarajanagara. Numerous trains run from Bengaluru and Mysore to Chamarajanagara.

Air 
The nearest airport is  Mysore Airport.

References 

Villages in Chamarajanagar district
Chamarajanagar district